KOLOUR‧Tsuen Wan is a private housing estate and shopping mall in Tsuen Wan Town, New Territories, Hong Kong. Its phase 1 (previously named as Tsuen Wan City Landmark I, opened in 1996) and phase 2 (previously named as Tsuen Wan City Landmark II  or Tsuen Wan Town Square , opened in 1989) are located at Chung On Street and Castle Peak Road respectively, and they were developed by Henderson Land Development.

Two phases are connected by air-conditioned pedestrian footbridge. The largest tenant of the shopping mall is Citistore Tsuen Wan Branch, which has been regarded as one of the landmarks in Tsuen Wan Town Centre. Citistore is also the subsidiary of Henderson Land Development.

References

External links

Private housing estates in Hong Kong
Shopping centres in Hong Kong
Buildings and structures completed in 1989
Buildings and structures completed in 1996
Tsuen Wan
Tsuen Wan District
Henderson Land Development